Commodore Raymond Hart  (24 June 1913 – 6 August 1999) was a British seaman and a Royal Navy officer who served during the Second World War.

Early life
Hart was born in Southampton. He was educated at Oakmount Preparatory School, and later King Edward VI School, Southampton. In 1929, aged 16, he joined the Merchant Navy and in 1937 the Royal Navy.

Service career
At the outbreak of the Second World War Hart was a lieutenant on the destroyer . In December 1942 Hart was appointed commander of destroyer , assigned to B-7 Escort Group under command of Lt Cdr. P. W. Gretton. In May 1943 during the defence of Convoy ONS 5 Vidette destroyed two U-boats; Hart was later awarded a bar to his DSC. In June he was promoted to lieutenant commander.
In October while working as a support group, B-7 assisted in the defence of convoys ON 206, ON 207 and ON 208. Nine U-boats were destroyed in total during these actions;  Vidette was credited with two, and Hart was Mentioned in Despatches.
In March 1944 he was given command of the destroyer ; in June they destroyed U-767 in the Channel.
In September 1944 Hart took command of frigate  and 21 Escort Group. Conn was credited with two U-boats destroyed in March 1945, and Hart was later awarded the DSO.

Later life
He was promoted to captain in 1953 and commodore in 1960, before retiring in 1963. Hart was appointed a CBE in 1963.
After retirement from the Royal Navy Hart held several positions in the Merchant Navy, being advisor to B&C until 1972, then fleet manager of Cayzer Irvine until 1976, during which time he was director of both companies. In 1974 Hart appeared in the documentary series The World at War, in the episode covering the Battle of the Atlantic.

Hart married in 1945 and had three children; two sons and a daughter. He died in Southampton, where he had lived, in 1999.

Successes
Hart was credited with the destruction of seven U-boats in his war-time service.

Footnotes

References
Citations

Bibliography

External links
 
 Raymond Hart at Uboat.net

Military personnel from Southampton
Royal Navy officers of World War II
Companions of the Distinguished Service Order
Commanders of the Order of the British Empire
Recipients of the Distinguished Service Cross (United Kingdom)
1913 births
1999 deaths
People educated at King Edward VI School, Southampton